James Leonard Turk is a Canadian  academic and labour leader. He is a frequent media commentator and public speaker on post-secondary education, academic freedom, labour and other public policy issues. Until June 2014, he was executive director of the Canadian Association of University Teachers (CAUT). In September 2014, Turk joined Ryerson University's school of journalism as a visiting professor.

Turk received his bachelor of arts (magna cum laude) from Harvard University, studied political science and philosophy as a Knox Fellow  at the University of Cambridge, received his master of arts from the University of California, Berkeley  and his doctor of philosophy from the University of Toronto.  He is married to Lynne Browne and they have three children.

Turk taught in the Department of Sociology at the University of Toronto, specializing in Canadian Studies  and Labour Studies. He left his position as a tenured associate professor to become research director for the United Electrical Workers Union of Canada. He served as director of education for the Ontario Federation of Labour and executive assistant to the national president of the Canadian Union of Public Employees before being selected for his position with CAUT. From 1990 to 1998, he chaired the Ontario Coalition for Social Justice and was a lead organizer of the Ontario's Days of Action.
Turk is a member of the Board of the Canadian Centre for Policy Alternatives, former secretary of the Harry Crowe Foundation,  and adjunct research professor at the Institute of Political Economy at Carleton University.  Previously he served as president of the Ontario New Democratic Party.

Books
 Academic Freedom in Conflict: The Struggle over Speech Rights in the University. (2014)
 Love, Hope, Optimism: An informal portrait of Jack Layton by those who knew him. (2012) Co-edited with Charis Wahl.
 Universities at Risk: How Politics, Special Interests and Corporatization Threaten the Integrity of the University. (2008)
 Free Speech in Fearful Times: After 9/11 in Canada, the U.S., Australia and Europe. Co-edited with Allan Manson.
 Disciplining Dissent: The Curbing of Free Expression in Academia and the Media. (2005). Co-edited with William Bruneau.
 The Corporate Campus: Commercialization and the Dangers to Canada's Universities and Colleges. (2000).
 It's Our Own Knowledge: Labour, Public Education & Skills Training. (1989).

Awards
 In May 2014, Turk received the Peter C. Dooley Legacy Award from the University of Saskatchewan Faculty Association
 In September 2013, Turk received the Jay Newman award for academic integrity.
 In 2012, Turk was presented the Distinguished Member Award from the Canadian Society for the Study of Higher Education (CSSHE) for having made distinguished contributions to the study of higher education.

External links 
Society for Academic Freedom and Scholarship - James L. Turk bio 
Lorimer contributor page
CCPA Board of Directors
Brock University Faculty Association: notice of talk
"Leader of a Faculty Union Reflects on Battles Won and the Continuing Struggle", June 2, 2014, The Chronicle of Higher Education

References 

Year of birth missing (living people)
Canadian trade unionists
Canadian non-fiction writers
Harvard University alumni
Living people
Academic staff of the University of Toronto